Carl A. DePasqua (October 28, 1927 – September 15, 2021) was an American football player and coach. DePasqua was an assistant coach at the University of Pittsburgh under head coach John Michelosen. He later served as the head football coach at Waynesburg University from 1966 to 1967 and at Pittsburgh from 1969 to 1972, compiling a career college football record of 32–30.  His Waynesburg Yellow Jackets won the NAIA Football National Championship in 1966.

Coaching career
DePasqua was an assistant coach at the University of Pittsburgh from 1958 until the firing of head coach John Michelosen after the 1965 season. DePasqua was the head football coach at the Waynesburg University in Waynesburg, Pennsylvania. He held that position for the 1966 and 1967 seasons. His coaching record at Waynesburg was 19–1. In 1968, DePasqua served as an assistant coach in the National Football League (NFL) for the Pittsburgh Steelers before returning to the University of Pittsburgh as head football coach in 1969. His Panther teams did turn in convincing wins against powerhouse teams such as West Virginia and Syracuse and posted a competitive season in 1970.

Death
His death was announced on September 17, 2021.

Head coaching record

References

1927 births
2021 deaths
Pittsburgh Panthers football coaches
Pittsburgh Panthers football players
Pittsburgh Steelers coaches
Waynesburg Yellow Jackets football coaches
Sportspeople from Williamsport, Pennsylvania
Players of American football from Pennsylvania